was a railway station on the Sekishō Line in Yūbari, Hokkaido, Japan, operated by Hokkaido Railway Company (JR Hokkaido). Yūbari Station opened on 1 November 1892. With the privatization of Japanese National Railways (JNR) on 1 April 1987, the station came under the control of JR Hokkaido. The station was closed when the Yubari Branch Line ceased operation on 31 March 2019.

Lines
Yūbari Station was the terminus of the 18.2 km Yūbari branch of the Sekishō Line. The station was numbered "Y25". but following the closure, it no longer appears on JR Hokkaido rail maps.

Station layout
The station consisted of a single ground-level side platform serving a terminating track. The Kitaca farecard could not be used at this station. The station was unattended.

Adjacent stations

Surrounding area
 Yūbari City Office
 Yūbari Post office

See also
 List of railway stations in Japan

References

Railway stations in Hokkaido Prefecture
Railway stations in Japan opened in 1892
Railway stations closed in 2019
Yūbari, Hokkaido